Southwestern Indiana is an 11-county region of southern Indiana, United States located at the southernmost and westernmost part of the state. As of the 2010 census, the region's combined population is 474,251. Evansville, Indiana's third-largest city, is the primary hub for the region, as well as the primary regional hub for a tri-state area that includes Kentucky and Illinois. Other regional hubs include Jasper, Vincennes, and Washington. Although part of a Midwestern state, this region's culture and language is aligned more with that of the Upland South rather than the Midwest.

Geography
Southwestern Indiana's topography is considerably more varied and complex than most of Indiana, from large tracts of forest, marshes, rolling fields, large flat valleys in the west and south, to several chains of low mountains, high hills, and sharp valleys towards the north and east. Every county in Southwestern Indiana is bounded by a river at one point, whether it be the Wabash River along the west, the Ohio River along the south, the White River, dividing the six northern counties between its two forks, or other smaller rivers. More than 50% of the boundaries of Daviess, Knox, Perry, Posey, and Spencer Counties are dictated by a river or a creek. Just under 50% of Gibson and Pike counties are dictated by a river. About 80% Knox County's boundaries are dictated by either the Wabash or the White River and its West Fork, essentially making the county a river peninsula. Additionally, over half of the area is located within the Wabash Valley Seismic Zone along with neighboring Southeastern Illinois.

Southwestern Indiana has clusters of separate towns of varying sizes and layouts. Vincennes is laid out in the French quadrangular, while Jasper and Princeton are laid out in a standard grid. Evansville is laid out in both modes of survey, with its downtown being mapped out from the river and the rest of the city being laid out in the standard grid.

Organizational definition
In addition to various media definitions, Southwestern Indiana is also defined by most Indiana state agencies, as well as various commercial and economic regions, as an entire area. All of Southwestern Indiana's counties are in Indiana's 8th Congressional District . Most of Southwestern Indiana is in the Roman Catholic Diocese of Evansville except for Perry County and Spencer County's Harrison Township, which are in the Archdiocese of Indianapolis. Southwestern Indiana makes up realtor region 12 in Indiana, while nine of the counties make up Economic Growth Region 11 with Daviess and Martin in Region 8.

In addition, the southern third of Southwestern Indiana exists within the Ohio River Valley American Viticultural Area, the second-largest wine appellation in the United States. The Ohio River Valley AVA occupies all of Perry, Posey, Spencer, Vanderburgh, and Warrick Counties, nearly 90% of Gibson County, and portions of Pike and Dubois Counties in Southwestern Indiana.

Counties

(T) - Establishment Date - Indiana Territory County

Metropolitan and micropolitan areas

Metropolitan area

Micropolitan areas

Political status
 , all of Southwestern Indiana is in the 8th Congressional District.

Highways

Interstate highways

 Interstate 64

The older interstate in the region, this stretch of I-64 has been the primary artery of east-west traffic since entering service around 1983. While relatively flat in Posey, Vanderburgh, and Gibson counties, its terrain becomes hillier as it passes through the  stretch in Warrick County. By the time it approaches U.S. 231, the hills and valleys are sharper, transitioning into the low mountainous conditions found in Perry County as the highway leaves into Crawford County.

 Interstate 69

The newer interstate in the region, this stretch of I-69 provides interstate access to Bloomington and, eventually, to Indianapolis. Like I-64, the terrain around Evansville is relatively flat, but becomes hillier in northeastern Gibson County, and becomes progressively hillier through Pike County. The stretch of I-69 in Daviess County between Washington and Elnora is actually flatter than the stretch in Vanderburgh County, while containing some hilly sections south of Washington, but becomes very hilly northeast of Elnora as the highway approaches Crane and leaves the area into Greene County.

U.S. highways

 U.S. Route 41 US 41 extends from Miami, Florida to the Upper Peninsula of Michigan. This four-lane highway serves the western half of the region. US 41 goes through the city of Evansville, becoming six lanes between the Lloyd Expressway and Diamond Avenue. It bypasses Princeton and Vincennes before continuing north towards Terre Haute.

 U.S. Route 50 US 50 extends from Baltimore, Maryland, to Sacramento, California. It is a winding two-lane road in the eastern half of the region which becomes a four-lane road in the western half, near Washington, before joining US 41 in the bypass around Vincennes. It intersects with I-69 just east of Washington. It leaves Indiana on the Red Skelton Bridge.

 U.S. Route 150 Coterminous with US 50 from Vincennnes to Shoals, it breaks off and heads eastward while US 50 continues northeast.

 U.S. Route 231  This now mostly new four-lane road serves the eastern half of the region. The route is in a process of relocation, as a new four-lane road is under construction from Rockport to Greene County, where it will intersect with Interstate 69.

Culture

Annual festivals and celebrations
 April
 Perry County Dogwood Tour - Perry County, Indiana
 May
 Gastoff Spring Festival - Montgomery, Indiana
 Historic Newburgh Wine and Arts Festival - Newburgh, Indiana
 Spirit of Vincennes Rendezvous - Vincennes, Indiana
 June
 Spencer County Fair - Grandview, Indiana
 Haubstadt Somerfest - Haubstadt, Indiana
 Evansville Freedom Festival - Evansville, Indiana
 July
 Germania Männerchor Volksfest - Evansville, Indiana
 Thunder on the Ohio - Evansville, Indiana
 4th of July Festival - Otwell, Indiana
 Gibson County Fair - Princeton, Indiana
 Cedar Valley Bluegrass Festival - Derby, Indiana
 Owensville Watermelon Festival - Owensville, Indiana
 St. Wendel Bierstube - St. Wendel, Indiana
 August
 Strassenfest - Jasper, Indiana
 Oakland City Sweetcorn Festival - Oakland City, Indiana
 Buffalo Trace Festival - Petersburg, Indiana
 Tell City Schweizer Fest - Tell City, Indiana
 Knox County Watermelon Festival - Bicknell, Indiana
 Princeton Golden Heritage Days - Princeton, Indiana
 Warrick County Fair - Boonville, Indiana
 Vanderburgh County Fair - Darmstadt, Indiana
 September
 Princeton Labor Day Celebration Princeton, Indiana
 Dale Fall Festival - Dale, Indiana
 Spirit of Vincennes Civil War Days - Vincennes, Indiana
 Fort Branch Fall Days - Fort Branch, Indiana
 Bear Hollow Fall Fest & Dasholz - St. Croix, Indiana
 Gastoff Fall Festival - Montgomery, Indiana
 Kunstfest - New Harmony, Indiana
 Poseyville Autumnfest - Poseyville, Indiana
 October
 West Side Nut Club Fall Festival - Evansville, Indiana
 Troy Pioneer Days - Troy, Indiana
 Spencer County Fair Octoberfest - Grandview, Indiana
 Hoosier Heritage Fall Tour - Perry County, Indiana
 Cannelton Heritage Festival - Cannelton, Indiana
 Rome Courthouse Days - Rome, Indiana
 Historic Newburgh Ghost Walks - Newburgh, Indiana
 Old Courthouse Catacombs - Old Vanderburgh County Courthouse
 November and December
 Muster on the Wabash (November) - Vincennes, Indiana (Fort Knox II)
 Santa Claus Christmas Celebration (December) - Santa Claus, Indiana
 Numerous Communities have Thanksgiving and Christmas Parades in November and December. There are also numerous Basketball Tournaments that occur in December, including the Gibson County Toyota Teamwork Classic.

Central Time vs. Eastern Time

From 1966 to 2006, the five southwesternmost counties—Gibson, Posey, Spencer, Vanderburgh, and Warrick—observed Central Daylight Time. The six northern and eastern counties—Daviess, Dubois, Knox, Martin, Perry, and Pike, since 1982—observed year-round Eastern Standard Time as did much of the rest of the state.

In 2006, Indiana Governor Mitch Daniels pushed through legislation for all Indiana counties to observe Daylight Timeon Eastern Time onto Eastern Daylight Time. This action threw both Southwestern and Northwestern Indiana into chaos as counties started to debate whether to return to the Central Time Zone or remain in the Eastern Time Zone and start observing daylight time. This resulted, on April 2, 2006, in all of Southwestern Indiana being in the Central Time Zone.

Not even a month after the change, people began to complain about some of the same problems that people who lived in the original Central Daylight Time counties had been complaining about for years. Most prevalent was the complaint that the Crane Naval Surface Warfare Center had become a "time island". The workers' union of the base subsequently petitioned the Martin County Commissioners to repetition for a change back to Eastern Time. The resulting chain reaction resulted in all of the former Eastern Time counties, along with two Central Time counties, Gibson and Spencer, petitioning for a change to Eastern Time.

On September 20, 2007, after only 15 months and only one winter on Central Time, the DOT returned only five of the eight applicants to the Eastern Time Zone. Gibson, Perry, and Spencer counties did not have enough support to be placed there. However, three of the five counties, Daviess, Knox, and Pike, had little support either, but "convenience of commerce" was given as the reason for their time changes, despite commute patterns into Evansville and the Toyota Motor Manufacturing Indiana plant in Gibson County, the region's largest employer. In Dubois County, a heated disagreement between Huntingburg and Jasper occurred over the topic. Most of Huntingburg's industry and economy is geared towards the Central Time Zone, where Owensboro, Kentucky, and Spencer County, and the Huntingburg area's largest employers, AK Steel and Holiday World, are located. Jasper, though, stated that the majority of its business activity is aimed at the Eastern Seaboard and that returning to the Eastern Time Zone would be in the best interest of the county. The final result was that Daviess, Dubois, Knox, Martin, and Pike counties returned to the Eastern Time Zone on November 4, 2007, once again dividing Southwestern Indiana.

References

 
Regions of Indiana
Geography of Daviess County, Indiana
Geography of Dubois County, Indiana
Geography of Gibson County, Indiana
Geography of Knox County, Indiana
Geography of Martin County, Indiana
Geography of Perry County, Indiana
Geography of Pike County, Indiana
Geography of Posey County, Indiana
Geography of Spencer County, Indiana
Geography of Vanderburgh County, Indiana
Geography of Warrick County, Indiana
Interstate 69